Jérémie Clément (born 8 October 1984) is a French professional footballer who plays as a centre-back for Championnat National 2 club Béziers.

References

1984 births
Living people
French footballers
French amputees
Association football central defenders
Nîmes Olympique players
AC Arlésien players
Paris FC players
Red Star F.C. players
AS Cannes players
US Pontet Grand Avignon 84 players
Le Puy Foot 43 Auvergne players
AS Béziers (2007) players
Ligue 2 players
Championnat National players
Championnat National 2 players
Championnat National 3 players